The ESA Centre for Earth Observation (also known as the European Space Research Institute or ESRIN) is a research centre belonging to the European Space Agency (ESA), located in Frascati (Rome) Italy. It is dedicated to research involving earth observation data taken from satellites, among other specialised activities. The establishment currently hosts the European Space Agency's development team for the Vega launcher.

History
ESLAR, a laboratory for advanced research was created in 1966 mainly to break the political deadlock over the location of ESLAB. Later renamed ESRIN, an acronym for European Space Research Institute, ESLAR was based in Frascati (Italy). The ESRO Convention describes ESRINs' role in the following manner:

The facility began acquiring data from environmental satellites within Earthnet programme in the 1970s.

See also
 European Space Operations Centre (ESOC)
 European Space Research and Technology Centre (ESTEC)
 European Space Astronomy Centre (ESAC)
 European Astronaut Centre (EAC)
 European Centre for Space Applications and Telecommunications (ECSAT)
 Guiana Space Centre (CSG)
 European Space Tracking Network (ESTRACK)
 European Space Agency (ESA)

References

External links

European Space Agency
1966 establishments in Italy
Remote sensing organizations